Hypocalymma angustifolium, the white myrtle, is a species of shrub in the myrtle family Myrtaceae, endemic to the south west region of Western Australia. The Noongar peoples know the plant as koodgeed or kudjidi.
 
It  grows up to 1.5 metres in height and has arching stems with narrow leaves.  
White or white and deep pink flowers are produced between June and October (early winter to mid spring) in its native range.

The species was first formally described by botanist Stephan Endlicher in 1837 as Leptospermum angustifolium. The species was transferred to the genus Hypocalymma in 1843 by Johannes Schauer.

Cultivation
This species can be maintained as a well-rounded bush in cultivation and is suitable for growing in a container. It requires good drainage and prefers a position in partial shade, protected from heat and wind. It has a degree of frost-resistance. Flowering stems may be cut for floral arrangements

The growth of the species is dry and fragile and an exposed plant is liable to be blown sideways, becoming a poor shape, with bare wood. In shelter, however, with adequate water and with yearly pruning for bushy growth, a more lush plant results which will live a good number of years with continued care. When five years old it will probably be a dense shrub 1 m high with flexible, thin weeping branches.

References

angustifolium
Endemic flora of Western Australia
Rosids of Western Australia
Taxa named by Stephan Endlicher